Paul IV, known as Paul the New (Παῦλος; ? – December 784) was Ecumenical Patriarch of Constantinople from 780 to 784. He had once opposed the veneration of icons but urged the calling of an ecumenical council to address the iconoclast controversy. Later, he resigned and retired to a monastery due to old age and illness. He was succeeded by Tarasios, who was a lay administrator at the time.

Paul the New is venerated as a saint in the Eastern Orthodox Church, and his feast day is celebrated on August 30.

References

784 deaths
8th-century patriarchs of Constantinople
8th-century Cypriot people
Year of birth unknown
Byzantine Iconoclasm